Alan "Buddy" Peshkin (1931 – December 7, 2000) was Professor of Education at Stanford University. He was awarded a Guggenheim Fellowship in 1973.

See also 

 God's Choice

References 

1931 births
2000 deaths
20th-century American educators
Jewish educators
Stanford University faculty
University of Chicago alumni
University of Illinois alumni
University of Wisconsin–Madison faculty
University of Illinois Urbana-Champaign faculty